John Martin Costello (January 15, 1903 – August 28, 1976) was an American lawyer and politician who served five terms as a U.S. Representative from California from 1935 to 1945.

Early life and career 
Born in Los Angeles, California, the son of Irish immigrants, Costello attended the public schools.
He was graduated from Loyola Law School, Los Angeles, California, in 1924.
He was admitted to the bar the same year and commenced practice in Los Angeles.
He was a teacher in Los Angeles secondary schools in 1924 and 1925.

Political career 
He was an unsuccessful candidate for election to the Seventy-third Congress in 1932.

Congress 
Costello was elected as a Democrat to the Seventy-fourth and to the four succeeding Congresses (January 3, 1935 – January 3, 1945).
He was an unsuccessful candidate for renomination in 1944 to the Seventy-ninth Congress.

Later career 
He served as general counsel and manager of the Washington office of the Los Angeles Chamber of Commerce from 1945 to 1947.
He engaged in the practice of law in Washington, D.C. from 1947 to 1976.

Death 
He died in Las Vegas, Nevada, August 28, 1976.
He was interred in Calvary Cemetery, Los Angeles, California.

See also
 List of members of the House Un-American Activities Committee

References

1903 births
1976 deaths
American people of Irish descent
Democratic Party members of the United States House of Representatives from California
California lawyers
Loyola Law School alumni
Politicians from Los Angeles
20th-century American politicians
20th-century American lawyers